Wólka-Lizigódź  is a village in the administrative district of Gmina Oporów, within Kutno County, Łódź Voivodeship, located seventy-seven miles west of Warsaw, Poland.

References

Villages in Kutno County